Flying syringe is a phrase that is used to refer to proposed, but not yet created, genetically modified mosquitoes that inject vaccines into people when they bite them.

History
In the 1990s, Bob Sinden of Imperial College, London, and Julian Crampton of the University of Liverpool, developed this idea and filled three related patents between 1997 and 2003.

In 2008, the Gates Foundation awarded $100,000 to Hiroyuki Matsuoka of Jichi Medical University in Japan to do research on them, with a condition that any discoveries that were funded by the grant must be made available at affordable prices in the developing world. If Matsuoka proves that his idea has merit, he will be eligible for an additional $1 million of funding. The Washington Post referred to flying syringes as a "bold idea".

See also

Hunter-seeker

References

Vaccination
Hypothetical technology
Culicidae